Fibis or FIBIS may refer to:

Families In British India Society (FIBIS), a genealogical organisation
Fibiș, a commune in Timiș County, Romania
 FIBiS (Italian Federation of Billiard Sport), organizer of the World Five-pins Championship